Ian Baker (born February 9, 1993) is an American professional basketball player for Trefl Sopot of the Polish Basketball League (PLK). He played college basketball for New Mexico State.

College career
As a junior, Baker averaged 13.8 points, 3.7 assists, 1.1 steals per game and was selected to the First Team All-WAC. He declared for the 2016 NBA Draft, but did not hire an agent and ultimately returned to school. In his senior year, he was named WAC Player of the Year. Baker averaged 17.3 points, 5.1 assists (2nd in WAC), and 4.9 rebounds per game. Baker was named WAC player of the week three times. He was also named MVP of the 2017 WAC men's basketball tournament.

Professional career
On August 1, 2017, Baker signed a two-year deal with Serbian club Partizan. On September 1, Baker and Partizan mutually agreed to part ways after Baker suffered a lower leg fracture.

References

External links
New Mexico State Aggies bio

1993 births
Living people
American expatriate basketball people in Poland
American men's basketball players
Basketball players from Washington, D.C.
New Mexico State Aggies men's basketball players
Point guards
South Bay Lakers players
Trefl Sopot players